Jennings Township is one of five townships in Scott County, Indiana. As of the 2010 census, its population was 6,633 and it contained 2,860 housing units.

Geography

Cities and towns
 Austin

References

External links
 Indiana Township Association
 United Township Association of Indiana

Townships in Scott County, Indiana
Townships in Indiana